Wesley Methodist Episcopal Church is a historic Methodist Episcopal church located at McClellandville, New Castle County, Delaware. It was built in 1854, and is a frame, one story, one bay by three bay, gable-roofed Greek Revival-style building.  It was sheathed in weatherboard and featured decorative wood shingles on the facade and corner pilasters.

It was added to the National Register of Historic Places in 1983.

References

Methodist churches in Delaware
Churches on the National Register of Historic Places in Delaware
Greek Revival church buildings in Delaware
Churches completed in 1854
Churches in New Castle County, Delaware
National Register of Historic Places in New Castle County, Delaware